Dictyochophyceae sensu lato is a photosynthetic lineage of heterokont algae.

Taxonomy
 Class Dictyochophyceae Silva 1980 s.l.
 Subclass Sulcophycidae Cavalier-Smith 2013
 Order Olisthodiscales Cavalier-Smith 2013
 Family Olisthodiscaceae Cavalier-Smith 2013
 Order Sulcochrysidales Cavalier-Smith 2013
 Family Sulcochrysidaceae Cavalier-Smith 2013
 Subclass Alophycidae Cavalier-Smith 2006 [Dictyochia Haeckel 1894 sensu Cavalier-Smith 1993]
 Infraclass Pelagophycia Andersen & Saunders 1993 emend. 1995 stat. nov. [Pelagophyceae Andersen & Saunders 1993]
 Order Pelagomonadales Andersen & Saunders 1993
 Family Pelagomonadaceae Andersen & Saunders 1993
 Order Sarcinochrysidales Gayral & Billard 1977
 Family Sarcinochrysidaceae Gayral & Billard 1977
 Infraclass Actinochrysia Cavalier-Smith 1995 stat. nov. 2006 (Axodines Patterson, 1994; Actinochrysea Cavalier-Smith 1995; Actinochrysophyceae Cavalier-Smith 1995; Dictyochophyceae Silva 1980 emend. Moestrup, 1995]
 Superorder Silicoflagellata Borgert 1890 sensu Lemmermann, 1901 emend. Moestrup 1995 [Silicophycidae Rothmaler 1951; Silicoflagellida; Silicomastigota; Dictyochidae Haeckel 1894; Dictyochophycidae; Dictyochea; Dictyochophyceae Silva 1980 s.s.]
 Order Florenciellales Eikrem, Edvardsen & Throndsen 2007
 Family Florenciellaceae
 Order Dictyochales Haeckel 1894
 Family Dictyochaceae Lemmermann 1901
 Superorder Abodines Patterson 2001 [Abaxodinae Mikrjukov 2001; Pedinellidae Cavalier-Smith 1986]
 Order Rhizochromulinales O’Kelly & Wujek 1994
 Family Rhizochromulinaceae O’Kelly & Wujek 1994
 Order Pedinellales Zimmermann, Moestrup & Hällfors 1984 [Actinomonadineae Cavalier-Smith 2006; Ciliophryineae Febvre-Chevalier ex Cavalier-Smith 2006]
 Family Cyrtophoraceae Pascher 1911
 Family Pedinellaceae Pascher 1910 [Actinomonadaceae Kent 1880; Ciliophryidae Poche, 1913]

References

External links

 
Ochrophyte classes